is a passenger railway station located in the city of Akishima, Tokyo, Japan, operated by East Japan Railway Company (JR East).

Lines 
Higashi-Nakagami Station is served by the Ōme Line, and is located 2.7 kilometers from the starting point of the line at Tachikawa Station.

Station layout 
This station consists of two side platforms serving two tracks,  connected by an elevated station building. The station is staffed.

Platforms

History
The station opened on 1 July 1942. With the privatization of Japanese National Railways (JNR) on 1 April 1987, the station came under the control of JR East.

Passenger statistics
In fiscal 2019, the station was used by an average of 7,186 passengers daily (boarding passengers only).

The passenger figures for previous years are as shown below.

Surrounding area
 Showa Memorial Park
Akishima Middle  School

See also
 List of railway stations in Japan

References

External links

JR East - Station Information 

Railway stations in Tokyo
Railway stations in Japan opened in 1942
Akishima, Tokyo
Ōme Line